Aameen Taqi Butt (born 17 July 1946) won the inaugural Pakistan Open (golf) tournament in 1967 as an amateur.

References

Pakistani male golfers
Aitchison College alumni
1946 births
Living people
Place of birth missing (living people)
20th-century Pakistani people